"Resonant Heart" is Japanese voice actress and singer Maaya Uchida's 4th single, released on May 11, 2016. The titular song from the single was used as the opening theme for the anime Seisen Cerberus: Ryuukoku no Fatalités.

Track listings

Charts

Event 
 『 Maaya Party！Vol.5』　Maaya Uchida 4th Single Release Event「Maaya Party！Vol.5」（May 21, 2016 - May 29, 2016：Tokyo, Aichi, Osaka）

Album

References

2016 singles
2016 songs
J-pop songs
Japanese-language songs
Pony Canyon singles
Anime songs